The Saint Joseph's Church, Wuxi, locally known as Saint Joseph's Church, Sanliqiao,  is a Roman Catholic church located in Beitang District of Wuxi, Jiangsu, China.

History 
The original church dates back to 1640, in the late Ming dynasty (1368–1644). 

The church became dilapidated for neglect after the  Chinese Rites controversy during the ruling of Yongzheng Emperor (1722–1735) of the Qing dynasty (1644–1911). In 1853, French missionaries Staislas Clavelin and Murice Sentinier refurbished and redecorated the church when they came to Wuxi to preach. Soon after, it was devastated by the Taiping Rebellion (1850–1864). Murice Sentinier restored the church again in 1864. In 1872, Adrien Languillat built a new building for the church. In 1891, a disastrous fire consumed the new church. And it was rebuilt by missionary Albert Tschepe in 1892.

In 1966, the Cultural Revolution broke out, the bell tower was removed and the church was used as warehouse. It was officially reopened to the public on 25 December 1980. The church was inscribed as a municipal cultural relic preservation organ in 1994 and a provincial cultural relic preservation organ in 2006, respectively.

Gallery

References 

Roman Catholic churches completed in 1892
Churches in Wuxi
Tourist attractions in Wuxi
1892 establishments in China
19th-century Roman Catholic church buildings in China